Mo may be a nickname for Maureen, Maurice, Marek, Monica, Morris, or other given names. It is more rarely a given name in its own right.

People with the name include:

Arts and media
 Mohammed Amer, Palestinian-American stand-up comedian. He is best known for his Netflix comedy special Mo Amer: The Vagabond, and his role as one third of the comedy trio Allah Made Me Funny.
 Mohamed Amin (1943–1996), Kenyan photojournalist
 Mo Gaffney (born 1958), American actress, comedian, writer and activist
 Mo Jamil, British singer who won the sixth series of The Voice UK
 Mo Rocca (born 1969), American writer, comedian, and political satirist
 Mo Willems (born 1968), American writer, animator, and creator of children's books
Mo Gilligan (born 1988), British stand-up comedian and television personality.

Government and politics
 Mo Brooks (born 1954), American politician from Alabama
 Mo Mowlam (1949–2005), British politician
 Mo Udall (1922–1998), U.S. Representative and former presidential candidate
 Wei Mo (793–858), official of the Chinese Tang dynasty
 Zhao Mo (died 122 BC), second ruler of the southeast Asian kingdom of Nanyue
 Zhongli Mo (died 201 BC), Chinese general

Sport
 Mo Farah (born 1983), British long-distance runner
 Mo Johnston (born 1963), Scottish former footballer
 Mo Martin (born 1982), American professional golfer
 Maurice Purify (born 1986), American football player
 Mohamed Salah (born 1992), Egyptian professional footballer who plays for Liverpool FC
 Mo Vaughn (born 1967), American baseball player
 Mariano Rivera, relief pitcher for the New York Yankees
 Maureen Connolly (1934–1969), American tennis player known as "Little Mo"
 Monique Jones, American professional bodybuilder nicknamed "Mo"

Other fields
 David Berg (1919–1994), American cult leader
 Mozi or Mo Tzi (c. 470–c. 390 BC), Chinese philosopher

In fiction
 Mo (Monica Testa), lead character of Alison Bechdel's strip Dykes to Watch Out For

See also
Moe (given name)
Mo (disambiguation)

References

Lists of people by nickname
Hypocorisms